Christian Daniel Smith (born 10 December 1987) is an English footballer who last played as a midfielder for  club Hendon.

A former Port Vale youth team player, he was a first team squad member in the 2006–07 season, also spending time on loan at Cambridge United and Northwich Victoria. In 2007, he signed with Clyde, moving on to Wrexham a year later. In 2009, he signed with York City, only to return to Wrexham later in the year. After loan spells at Newport County, Barrow and Tamworth, he left the club for a second time in 2011, after which he joined Chester. He helped the club to the Northern Premier League title in 2011–12. He signed with Nantwich Town in August 2012, before joining AFC Telford United in March 2013. He signed with Chelmsford City in June 2013. He was loaned out to Hayes & Yeading United in February 2015, and joined Bishop's Stortford permanently three months later. In November 2015 he joined Maidenhead United, and helped the club to the National League South title in 2016–17. He moved on to Wealdstone in November 2018, before joining Dulwich Hamlet in June 2019. He moved on to Hampton & Richmond Borough in September 2020 and rejoined Hayes & Yeading United in July 2021, before moving on to Hendon the following month. He played on the losing side of the 2022 London Senior Cup final.

Career

Born in Crewe, Cheshire, Smith started his career with the Port Vale youth system in 2004. He was to train with the first team in the 2006–07 season and was first involved after being named on the bench in a 1–1 against Hartlepool United on 6 May 2006. He made his debut, and only appearance, on 1 January 2007 against Scunthorpe United in a 0–0 draw after coming on as a 70th minute substitute. He was loaned out to Conference National side Cambridge United on 25 January for a one-month period. He made his debut in a 3–0 victory over Woking on 27 January and scored the winning goal in a 2–1 victory over Stafford Rangers. The loan was extended until 21 April in March, but was recalled on 20 March. He finished the spell with six appearances. He then joined Conference National team Northwich Victoria on loan on 22 March. He made his debut in a 4–0 defeat to former club Cambridge on 25 March and finished the spell with three appearances. Smith finished the 2006–07 season with one appearance for Vale and the club announced on 9 May that he would be released when his contract expired on 30 June.

Smith trialled with League Two team Bury before moving to Scotland to sign with Scottish First Division side Clyde in August. He made his debut in the opening game of the 2007–08 season, a 3–2 defeat away to Greenock Morton on 4 August. Smith started in Clyde's first 11 matches of the season, before being handed a red card against Livingston on 29 September in the 88th minute, which led to him dropping out of the team due to suspension. He made his return as an 81st-minute substitute in a 1–0 defeat to Morton on 20 October. He was released by Clyde in June 2008 after making 32 appearances.

He had a trial with newly-relegated Conference Premier side Wrexham in August 2008, and was offered an initial one-month contract. He scored Wrexham's fourth goal in a 5–0 victory over Stevenage Borough on 9 August, his debut for the team. He was offered two new contracts at Wrexham in December, but rejected these and left on 5 January 2009 following the expiry of his short-term contract. He trialled with League Two side Macclesfield Town and was expected to sign a contract with the club, but this was delayed. He eventually signed for Conference Premier rivals York City on a short-term contract until the end of the 2008–09 season on 15 January. He scored on his debut with a shot from 30 yards, with York beating Lewes 3–0 on 17 January. This was followed by Smith scoring York's goal with a header in a 2–1 defeat at Eastbourne Borough. He was released by York following the end of the 2008–09 season, after making 15 appearances and scoring two goals for the team.

He had a trial with former club Wrexham in July and played in the second half of a 0–0 draw with Prestatyn Town in a pre-season friendly. He was offered a contract to return to Wrexham in August.

On 26 November 2010, Smith joined Conference Premier rivals Newport County on loan until January 2011, and made his debut a day later as a 70th-minute substitute in a 2–1 victory over Hayes & Yeading United. This would prove his only Newport appearance. Upon his return to Wrexham in January he was suspended by manager Dean Saunders for insulting the club over Twitter. He was sent out on loan to Barrow later in the month. After five appearances he returned to Wales, then in March went on to join Tamworth on an emergency loan. He made seven appearances for Tamworth and in his final appearance, a 2–1 victory over Forest Green Rovers on 30 April, he scored the opening goal of a result that ensured the team's survival from relegation.

Released by Wrexham, he joined Chester of the Northern Premier League Premier Division in August, after impressing on trial. The "Blues" stormed to the league title in 2011–12 with a tally of 100 points, and thereby won promotion into the Conference North. He left the club at the end of the season. Following his release he spent most of the pre-season on trial with AFC Telford United.

He signed for Jimmy Quinn's Northern Premier League side Nantwich Town in August 2012. He moved on to Airbus UK Broughton in January 2013, before joining AFC Telford United via Stafford Rangers in March 2013, who were struggling to avoid relegation out of the Conference Premier. He returned to Stafford Rangers in mid-April, helping the club to win the Walsall Senior Cup with a 2–1 victory over Walsall. He moved onto Dean Holdsworth's Conference South side Chelmsford City in June 2013. He helped the "Clarets" to a 17th-place finish in 2013–14.

He was loaned out to Conference South rivals Hayes & Yeading United in February 2015. Hayes finished one place above the relegation zone at the end of the 2014–15 season. He signed with Bishop's Stortford just before the start of the 2015–16 season. He switched to Maidenhead United in November 2015. He went on to make 22 league appearances in the 2015–16 campaign as Maidenhead posted a seventh-place finish, and then played 24 league games in 2016–17 as Alan Devonshire's "Magpies" were promoted as champions. He also scored the only goal of the Berks & Bucks Senior Cup final against Hungerford Town. He scored two goals in 36 appearances in the 2017–18 campaign as Maidenhead consolidated their National League status with a 12th-place finish. Smith played 12 times for the "Magpies" in the 2018–19 season, scoring one goal in the FA Cup, before joining Wealdstone on 21 November 2018. He scored five goals in 23 appearances for the "Stones" during the 2018–19 season.

In June 2019, Smith joined Dulwich Hamlet, along with Wealdstone teammate Jeffrey Monakana. Hamlet won three of their opening four games of the 2019–20 season and Smith was quick to praise the training facilities at Champion Hill. On 19 October, he scored the opening goal in a 2–1 victory at Havant & Waterlooville that took the club into the First Round Proper of the FA Cup for the first time in 21 years. He also scored in the next round, a 4–1 defeat to Carlisle United. He scored a total of six goals in 32 appearances in the 2019–20 National League South season, which was permanently suspended on 26 March due to the COVID-19 pandemic in England, with Hamlet in 16th-place.

Smith joined Hampton & Richmond Borough on 5 September 2020, rejoining former Maidenehad teammates Rene Steer, Dean Inman and Charlie Wassmer. He made 14 appearances before the 2020–21 season was curtailed early due to the ongoing pandemic. In July 2021, Smith re-signed for Hayes and Yeading United, now in the Southern League Premier Division South. However, he then moved on to Hendon before the start of the 2021–22 season. He scored two goals in 39 appearances – both goals coming in his first two games – throughout the 2021–22 campaign, and was also sent off twice. He featured in the London Senior Cup final defeat to Brentford B, missing a penalty kick in the shoot-out. Smith left Hendon in June 2022.

Career statistics

Honours
Chester
Northern Premier League Premier Division: 2011–12

Stafford Rangers
Walsall Senior Cup: 2013

Maidenhead United
National League South: 2016–17
Berks & Bucks Senior Cup: 2017

Hendon
London Senior Cup runner-up: 2022

References

1987 births
Living people
Sportspeople from Crewe
English footballers
Black British sportsmen
Association football midfielders
Port Vale F.C. players
Cambridge United F.C. players
Northwich Victoria F.C. players
Clyde F.C. players
Wrexham A.F.C. players
York City F.C. players
Newport County A.F.C. players
Barrow A.F.C. players
Tamworth F.C. players
Chester F.C. players
Nantwich Town F.C. players
Airbus UK Broughton F.C. players
Stafford Rangers F.C. players
AFC Telford United players
Chelmsford City F.C. players
Hayes & Yeading United F.C. players
Bishop's Stortford F.C. players
Maidenhead United F.C. players
Wealdstone F.C. players
Dulwich Hamlet F.C. players
Hampton & Richmond Borough F.C. players
Hendon F.C. players
English Football League players
National League (English football) players
Northern Premier League players
Scottish Football League players
Southern Football League players